The 2016 Southern Conference men's soccer season was the 21st season of men's varsity soccer in the conference.

The UNC Greensboro Spartans are the defending regular season champions, and the Furman Paladins are the defending tournament champions.

Changes from 2015 

 None

Teams

Stadia and locations 

 Chattanooga, The Citadel, Samford and West Carolina do not sponsor men's soccer

Regular season

Results 
Each team played their conference opponent twice: once home, and once away.

Rankings

Postseason

SoCon Tournament 

Tournament details to be announced.

NCAA tournament

All-SoCon Sun awards and teams

See also 
 2016 NCAA Division I men's soccer season
 2016 Southern Conference Men's Soccer Tournament
 2016 Southern Conference women's soccer season

References 

 
2016 NCAA Division I men's soccer season